Nathaniel Blackwell (born February 15, 1965) is an American retired professional basketball player and former coach. He was a 6'4" (1.93 m) and 170 lb (77 kg) point guard who played collegiately for Temple University.

Blackwell averaged 19.8 points per game as a senior at Temple, helping the team finish 32–4. He scored 1,708 points in his career. He was selected by the San Antonio Spurs of the National Basketball Association in the second round (27th pick overall) of the 1987 NBA draft. He played for the Spurs for 10 games in 1987–88.

Blackwell served as a graduate assistant coach at Temple from 1990 to 1992. From 1992 to 1996 he was an assistant coach at Coppin State. Blackwell returned to Temple as an assistant in 1996. He resigned on May 2, 2003 due to personal reasons. Blackwell had been considered a potential successor to John Chaney, but addiction issues ended his coaching career.

References

External links

1965 births
Living people
South Philadelphia High School alumni
All-American college men's basketball players
American men's basketball players
Basketball players from Philadelphia
Point guards
San Antonio Spurs draft picks
San Antonio Spurs players
Shooting guards
Temple Owls men's basketball players
Temple Owls men's basketball coaches
Coppin State Eagles men's basketball coaches